Donny & Marie is an American talk show hosted by Donny and Marie Osmond, but with a reboot, that aired in syndication from September 1998 to May 2000 and was produced by Dick Clark, with Merrill Osmond as executive producer. The show had a "house band", featuring Jerry Williams (musical director/keyboards), Kat Dyson (guitar), Paul Peterson (bass), and Nick Vincent (drums).

References

External links
 
 Osmond.com - Donny & Marie feature

1998 American television series debuts
2000 American television series endings
1990s American television talk shows
2000s American television talk shows
English-language television shows
First-run syndicated television programs in the United States
Television series by Sony Pictures Television
Television series by Dick Clark Productions